Yuken Teruya (jap. 照屋 勇賢, Teruya Yūken; born 1973 in Haebaru, Okinawa) is an artist based in New York City and Berlin.

Biography
Teruya was born and raised in Okinawa. He received his BFA at Tama Art University in 1996, his Postbaccalaureate at Maryland Institute College of Art in 1999 and his MFA at the School of Visual Arts NY.

Works
Teruya is known equally for his intricate works in paper reflecting on consumer culture as well as for his artful use of traditional textile techniques to deal with political and cultural issues in his homeland Okinawa.

"Yuken Teruya filters his observations of contemporary life and his native Okinawa into elegant, evocative mixed-media installations, sculptures, and public art projects that speak of the shaping forces of consumerism, politics, and history. Using humble materials, like toilet paper roles and pizza boxes, he crafts visions that reveal the disharmony between human beings and nature, and among ourselves. The delicacy and beauty of his works belie their critical edge. In You-I, You-I (2002–05), for example, he re-worked the patterning on Okinawa’s traditional kimono, interrupting images of indigenous flora and fauna with those of U.S. fighter jets and paratroopers, representing American and Japanese colonization. Trees recur throughout Teruya’s works. He has cut them out of toilet paper roles and shopping bags, materials they were destroyed to create, symbolic of our over-abundant consumer culture and its disregard for nature." - Artsy.net

Exhibitions
Teruya's work was shown at the Guggenheim New York, the Biennale of Sydney, Greater New York 2005 at MoMA PS.1, Shanghai Biennale, Saatchi Gallery London, Moscow Biennale, Yokohama Triennale, the US Ambassador's House, Tokyo, 21st Century Museum of Contemporary Art, Kanazawa, Japan, and in various other exhibitions in the United States, Europe and Asia.

Significance
Teruya's work is regarded as influential in the art world and beyond. While Artfacts.net ranks him as one of the top 100 artists from Japan, he also had collaborations with The New York Times and other newspapers and his work is featured on academic literature on Okinawa

Public collections (selection)
 Guggenheim Museum, New York, US
 The Museum of Modern Art, New York, US
 Daiichi Seimei Museum, Tokyo, Japan
 Seattle Art Museum, Seattle, US
 Twigg-Smith Museum, Honolulu, US
 Hoffman Collection, Berlin, Germany
 Ethnological Museum, Berlin, Germany
 Altoids Collection, New Museum, New York, US
 Norton Collection, New York, US
 Charles Saatchi Collection, London, UK
 Sakima Art Museum, Okinawa, Japan
 Mori Art Museum, Tokyo, Japan
 Museum of Contemporary Art Tokyo, Japan
 21st Century Museum of Contemporary Art, Ishikawa, Japan

Awards
 2007 Painters and Sculptors Grant Program Award, Joan Mitchell Foundation, US
 2006 Artist in Residence Award, Art Scope Daimler Chrysler Japan, Japan
 2005 NYFA fellowship - Lily AuchinclossLily Auchincloss Fellow 200 -Vision of Contemporary Artists, Japan
 2005     Emerging Artist Award, The Aldrich Museum of Contemporary Arts, US
 2001 Skowhegan School of Painting and Sculpture Fellowship, Skowhegan, US

References

External links
 Yuken Teruya Official Website
 Yuken Teruya on ArtNet.com
 Yuken Teruya on Artfacts.net 
 Interview with Asian Art Newspapers

People from Okinawa Prefecture
Artists from Okinawa Prefecture
Living people
1973 births
Japanese emigrants to the United States
Japanese contemporary artists
21st-century American artists
21st-century Japanese artists
20th-century American artists
20th-century Japanese artists
Haebaru
Japanese sculptors
Interdisciplinary artists
Recycled art artists